
Lenton Brae is an Australian winery at Wilyabrup, in the Margaret River wine region of Western Australia.

Established in 1982, the winery first came to prominence in 1990, when it won two trophies, including the wine-of-the-show prize, at the SGIO WA Winemakers exhibition.  In 2009, leading Australian wine writer James Halliday rated Lenton Brae as one of the best wineries in the Margaret River region.

See also

 Australian wine
 List of wineries in Western Australia
 Western Australian wine

References

Notes

Bibliography

External links
Lenton Brae – official site

Food and drink companies established in 1982
Wilyabrup, Western Australia
Wineries in Western Australia
1982 establishments in Australia